Ahmed Gacmayare is a Somali politician who was from 2008 until 2012 the spokesperson for the SSC movement, and in 2012 became the minister for information and culture.

See also
Politics of Somalia

References

Somalian politicians
Living people
Year of birth missing (living people)